Jan Gunnarsson and Anders Järryd were the defending champions but lost in the first round to Jeff Brown and Scott Melville.

Udo Riglewski and Michael Stich won in the final 6–4, 6–4 against Jorge Lozano and Todd Witsken.

Seeds

  Rick Leach /  Jim Pugh (first round)
  Jorge Lozano /  Todd Witsken (final)
  Udo Riglewski /  Michael Stich (champions)
  Jeremy Bates /  Andrew Castle (semifinals)

Draw

External links
 1990 CA-TennisTrophy Doubles draw

Doubles